Ben Butbul (born 22 May 1990) is an Israeli professional association football player. He currently plays for Beitar Ashdod as a defensive midfielder.

References 
 

1990 births
Living people
Israeli footballers
F.C. Ashdod players
Hapoel Jerusalem F.C. players
Hapoel Acre F.C. players
Maccabi Herzliya F.C. players
Maccabi Sha'arayim F.C. players
F.C. Dimona players
F.C. Kafr Qasim players
Hapoel Ashdod F.C. players
Maccabi Ironi Ashdod F.C. players
Israeli Premier League players
Liga Leumit players
Israeli people of Moroccan-Jewish descent
Footballers from Ashdod
Association football midfielders